Nishnabotna is an extinct town in Atchison County, in the U.S. state of Missouri. The GNIS classifies it as a populated place.

Nishnabotna was laid out in 1877, and named after the nearby Nishnabotna River. A post office called Nishnabotna was established in 1871, and remained in operation until 1953.

References

Ghost towns in Missouri
Former populated places in Atchison County, Missouri